The masculine name Ander is a variant of the Greek name "Andreas". Other variants of the Greek name "Andreas" are Andrés and Andrew, as well as Anders.

The masculine name Ander is a variant Basque form of Andrew.

Notable people with the name Ander include:

Given name
 Ander Crenshaw (born 1944), American banker, attorney and politician
 Ander Monson, American novelist, poet, and nonfiction writer
 Ander Monro (born 1981), Canadian rugby player
 Ander Herrera (born 1989), Spanish footballer
 Ander Lafuente Aguado (born 1983), Spanish footballer
 Ander Elosegi (born 1987), Spanish slalom canoeist
 Ander Gago (born 1984), Spanish footballer
 Ander García, Spanish basketball player
 Ander Garitano (born 1969), Spanish football player and coach
 Ander Iturraspe (born 1989), Spanish footballer
 Ander Mirambell (born 1983), Spanish skeleton racer
 Ander Murillo (born 1983), Spanish/Basque footballer
 Ander Olaizola (born 1989), Spanish footballer
 Ander Vilariño (born 1980), Spanish racecar driver
 Ander Barrenetxea (born 2001), Spanish footballer
 Ander Capa (born 1992), Spanish footballer 
 Ander Vitoria (born 1990), Spanish footballer
 Walter Ander Williams (born 1970), American basketball player
 Ander Gil (born 1974), Spanish teacher and politician serving as the 62nd and current president of the Senate of Spain since 2021.

Characters with the given name 
  Ander Muñoz, he is one of the protagonists of the Netflix series Elite played by Arón Piper.
 Ander Elessedil, character in Terry Brooks' epic fantasy novel The Elfstones of Shannara

Surname
Charlotte Ander (1902–1969), daughter of German stage/film couple Rudolf Andersch and Ida Perry
Johan Alfred Ander (1873–1910), convicted Swedish murderer, the last person to be officially executed in Sweden

Surnames from given names